Stallion Bus is an American bus manufacturer and distributor. They are the North American distributor for Higer Bus from China and their primary products include mid-size coach body built on a Freightliner chassis, Cutaway buses, Customized Mercedes Sprinter vans, and specialty vehicles. Their equipment meets "Buy America"  standards and is Altoona Rated. The company was founded in 2006 and now supplies buses all over the United States, Canada, and abroad.

Models
2006–present    (Example: 938L)

Current
Stallion currently produces many different product lines.

Gallery

References

External links

Official Website

Bus manufacturers of the United States
Vehicle manufacturing companies established in 2006
Natural gas vehicles
Hybrid electric bus manufacturers
Electric vehicle manufacturers of the United States
American companies established in 2006